Hydroxyestriol may refer to:

 2-Hydroxyestriol
 4-Hydroxyestriol
 15α-Hydroxyestriol (estetrol)